École Maïmonide is a French-language Jewish day school in Montreal, Quebec. The school has two campuses: the Parkhaven Campus in Côte Saint-Luc and the Jacob Safra Campus in Saint-Laurent.

History
The years between 1950 and 1980 saw the departure of almost the entire Jewish community from Morocco, mostly to Israel and France, as Arab nationalism and tension between Israel and its neighbours led them to seek refuge elsewhere. Several thousand Moroccan Jews emigrated to Quebec, with immigration reaching its peak between 1965 and 1967 as Canada relaxed its quotas for North African Jews and Quebec's immigration laws began favouring francophones.

At the time of their arrival, Quebec's confessional school system prohibited Jews from attending French-language Catholic schools, relegating them to the  English-language Protestant public school system. The existing Jewish community, meanwhile, which had historically associated with the anglophone minority, had no French institutions to offer the new immigrants. At its fifteenth plenary session in May 1968, the Canadian Jewish Congress committed to assisting the Association séfarade francophone (the main organ of the francophone Jewish community) in creating a French-language Jewish school in Montreal. A committee representing both groups met with the Ministry of Education to discuss implementation of the motion. The project was approved and École Maïmonide formed in 1969, initially in a wing of the Catholic Saint Antonin School, with costs shared by the Montreal Catholic School Commission, Allied Jewish Community Services, and the United Jewish Relief Agencies of Canada. The school moved to its own premises in Côte Saint-Luc in 1972.

The school opened its second campus in Saint-Laurent in 1990.

Academics
In the 2018 Fraser Institute Quebec secondary school rankings, the Jacob Safra Campus was ranked 44th in the province and the Parkhaven Campus was ranked 194th (out of 452).

References

1969 establishments in Quebec
Côte Saint-Luc
Educational institutions established in 1969
Elementary schools in Montreal
High schools in Montreal
Jewish day schools
Jewish schools in Canada
Jews and Judaism in Montreal
Private schools in Quebec
Saint-Laurent, Quebec
École